Psychotria rufipilis is an African rainforest understory shrub from the coffee family, Rubiaceae.

References

rufipilis
Taxa named by Émile Auguste Joseph De Wildeman